Toufik Benamokrane (born 22 March 1980 in Souk El-Thenine, Béjaïa Province) is an Algerian former football player. He played for the AS Khroub from 2011 to 2013, and retired at the end of the 2013 season.

Club career
In 2007, Benamokrane joined MSP Batna after spending one season with JSM Béjaïa. In April 2010, Benamokrane was kicked off the team by team president Messaoud Zidani.

In July 2010, Toufik Benamokrane joined the MC El Eulma for a year. In July 2011, he is transferred to the AS Khroub, where he retired in July 2013.

References

External links
 DZFoot.com Profile
 

1980 births
Living people
People from Souk El Ténine, Béjaïa Province
Kabyle people
Algerian footballers
Algerian Ligue Professionnelle 1 players
JSM Béjaïa players
MC El Eulma players
MSP Batna players
Association football midfielders
21st-century Algerian people